'St. George's College Aruvithura, Erattupetta' is a government-aided college affiliated to the Mahatma Gandhi University. It is located in Erattupetta, Kottayam District in Kerala, India. It was accredited 'A' Grade by NAAC. College is managed by St. George's Syro-Malabar Catholic Forane Church,Erattupetta and is named after the patron saint of the church.

History
The college started functioning on July 19, 1965, as a junior college. College was pioneered under the patronage of Sebastian Vayalil. Initially, there were five batches in the pre-degree class. In 1978, college was upgraded to full-fledged degree college. College was accredited by NAAC at the four-star level in 2000.

Campus
The college is situated in the foothills of the Western Ghats, near the Meenachil river, providing a picturesque and serene environment for learning. The campus covers an area of approximately 20 acres and includes academic buildings, a library, a hostel, a canteen, a playground, and a chapel.

Academics
St. George's College offers undergraduate courses in arts, science, and commerce streams. The college also offers postgraduate courses in mathematics, physics, chemistry, and commerce. The college is known for its emphasis on the holistic development of students, with a focus on both academic and extracurricular activities.

Library
The college library was established in 1965 and was upgraded to a first-grade library in 1978. The library has a collection of over 32,000 books, 58 periodicals, 250 CDs, and access to eight newspapers. The library also provides access to the National Digital Library of India (NDLI) and the NLIST facility.

Green Initiatives
The college has taken various initiatives to promote sustainable practices on campus. The campus has a rainwater harvesting system, an incinerator for waste management, and a botanical garden. The college also has a fish farm and a polyhouse for sustainable agriculture practices. Alternative energy sources, such as solar power, are also used to meet the energy needs of the campus.

Notable alumni
 Jacob Thomas (police officer)

External links

References 

Colleges in Kerala
Universities and colleges in Kottayam district
Colleges affiliated to Mahatma Gandhi University, Kerala
Educational institutions established in 1965
1965 establishments in Kerala